The sixth season of MacGyver, an American television series, began September 17, 1990, and ended on May 6, 1991. It aired on ABC. The region 1 DVD was released on June 13, 2006.

Season 6 follows the adventures of an ingenious, resourceful American operative, MacGyver, who is assigned difficult missions by the private think tank, the Phoenix Foundation. The Phoenix Foundation fights criminals around the world, and MacGyver usually avoids direct conflict with them by utilizing common items to create inventive traps and solutions to problems he faces while stopping his enemies.

Episodes

References

External links 
 
 

1990 American television seasons
1991 American television seasons
MacGyver (1985 TV series) seasons